The County of Empúries, also known as the County of Ampurias, was a medieval county centred on the town of Empúries and enclosing the Catalan region of Peralada. It corresponds to the historic comarca of Empordà.

After the Franks conquered the regions in 785, Empúries and Peralada came under the authority of the County of Girona. Around 813, Empúries, with Peralada, became a separate county under Ermenguer. He and the other early counts were probably of Visigothic origin. In 817, Empúries was merged with the County of Roussillon, a union which lasted until 989. One of the ninth-century counts of Empúries assembled a fleet powerful enough to conquer the Balearic Islands, but only for a brief time. From 835 to 844, Sunyer I ruled Empúries and Peralada while Alaric I ruled Roussillon and Vallespir.

At the death of Gausfred I in 989, Roussillon and Empúries were separated. Gausfred's elder son Hugh I received Empúries while Giselbert I received Roussillon. Hugh's comital dynasty lasted until 1322, when Empúries passed to a collateral branch of his family. The last count, Hugh VI, sold the county to Peter IV of Ribagorza in 1325 in exchange for the barony of Pego and the towns of Xaló and Laguar, all located within the Kingdom of Valencia. Peter later traded it with Ramon Berenguer d'Aragona for the county of Prades in 1341. From that point on, Empúries was an apanage of the Crown of Aragon.

In a letter of December 1002, Pope Sylvester II confirmed the county of Empúries and the "county of Pedralbes" as a part of the diocese of Girona. The latter is probably to be identified with the Peralada region in the north of Empúries. A portion of the "taxes of the port", consisting of dues and anchorage, were passed on to the diocese.

List of counts
Ermenguer 813–817
Gaucelm  817–832 (united to Roussillon)
Berengar the Wise 832–835
Sunyer I 835–841 (united to Roussillon)
 841–844
Sunyer I 844–848, again
William 848–850 (united to Roussillon)
Odalric 852–858 (united to Roussillon)
Humfrid 858–862 (united to Roussillon)
Sunyer II 862–915 (united to Roussillon)
Dela 862–894, associated
Gausbert 915–931 (united to Roussillon and Perelada as a county)
Bencion 915–916, associated
Gausfred I  931–989
Hugh I 989/91–1040
 1040–1078 (transferred Perelada, as a viscountcy, to his son )
Hugh II 1078–1116
 1116–1154, also as Ponç Hug I
 1154–1173
 1173–1200
 1173–1175, associated, also known as Ponç Hug d'Entença
 1200–1230
 1230–1269, also as Ponç Hug III
 1269–1277
Ponç V 1277–1313, also as Ponç Hug IV (also viscount of Bas)
 1313–1322, also as Ponç Hug V Malgauli (also viscount of Bas)
 1322–1327
 1322–1325
Peter I 1325–1341
 1341–1364
 1364–1386, 1387–1398
Peter II 1386–1387, also king of Aragon
 1398–1401
 1401–1402
 1402
Martin 1042, 1407–1410, also king of Aragon
Maria de Luna 1402–1407
Empúries escheated to the crown between 1410 and 1436. Subsequently the title is mostly honorific.
Henry I 1436–1445
Henry II 1445–1522
Alfons I 1522–1563
Francesc I 1563–1572
Joana II 1572–1608
Enric III 1608–1640
Lluís 1640–1670
Joaquim 1670, died aged 3.
Pere IV 1670–1690
Caterina 1690–1697
Luis Francisco de la Cerda 1697–1711
Nicolás Fernández de Córdoba-Figueroa de la Cerda 1711-1739
Luis Antonio Fernández de Córdoba-Figueroa y Spinola 1739-1768
Pedro de Alcántara Fernández de Córdoba-Figueroa y de Montcada 1768-1789
Luis María Fernández de Córdoba y Gonzaga 1789-1806
Luis Joaquin Fernández de Córdoba y Benavides 1806-1840
Luis Tomás Fernández de Córdoba y Ponce de León 1840-1873
Luis María Fernández de Córdoba y Pérez de Barradas 1873-1879
Luis Jesús María Fernandez de Cordoba y Salabert 1880-1956
María Victoria Eugenia Fernandez de Cordoba y Fernández de Henestrosa 1956-1987
Ignacio de Medina y Fernández de Córdoba 1987-2006
Sol María de La Blanca de Medina Orleáns Bragança 2006–

Notes

References
Lattin, Harriet Pratt (ed.) The Letters of Gerbert, with his Papal Privileges as Sylvester II. Columbia University Press, 1961.
Lewis, A. R., and Runyan, Timothy J. European Naval and Maritime History, 300–1500. Indiana University Press, 1985.
Lewis, A. R. The Development of Southern French and Catalan Society, 718–1050. University of Texas Press, 1965.
Riera Fortiana, Enrique. "Etapa barcelonesa del condado de Ampurias (1409–1456)" Annals de l'Institut d'Estudis Empordanesos 11 (1976), 260–85.

 
Empúries
Empúries
Empúries